The 2022 United States House of Representatives elections in Nebraska were held on November 8, 2022, to elect the three U.S. representatives from the state of Nebraska, one from each of the state's three congressional districts. The elections coincided with the Nebraska gubernatorial election, as well as other elections to the U.S. House of Representatives, elections to the U.S. Senate, and various state and local elections.

Nebraska's primary elections took place on May 10th, 2022.

Overview

District 1 

The 1st district is located in eastern Nebraska surrounding Omaha and its suburbs, taking in Lincoln, Bellevue, Fremont, and Norfolk. The incumbent is Republican Mike Flood, who was elected with 52.7% of the vote in a 2022 special election after the previous incumbent, Jeff Fortenberry, resigned March 31, 2022 after having been indicted and convicted on charges of lying to the FBI about campaign donations.

Republican primary

Candidates

Nominee 
 Mike Flood, incumbent U.S. representative

Eliminated in primary 
 John Glen Weaver, U.S. Air Force veteran
 Thireena Yuki Connely, teacher
 Curtis D. Huffman, welder

Withdrawn 
 Jeff Fortenberry, former U.S. representative and convicted felon

Declined 
 Mike Foley, Lieutenant Governor of Nebraska, former Nebraska State Auditor, and candidate for governor in 2014 (running for State Auditor)
 Tony Fulton, Nebraska Tax Commissioner and former state senator
 Suzanne Geist, state senator
 Mike Hilgers, Speaker of the Nebraska Legislature (running for Attorney General)
 Julie Slama, state senator

Endorsements

Polling

Results

Democratic primary

Candidates

Nominee 
Patty Pansing Brooks, state senator

Eliminated in primary 
Jazari Kual, community activist

Endorsements

Results

General election

Predictions

Results

District 2 

The 2nd district covers the Omaha metropolitan area, including all of Douglas County, home to the city of Omaha, and suburban parts of northern Sarpy County, including La Vista and Papillon. The incumbent is Republican Don Bacon, who was re-elected with 50.8% of the vote in 2020 on the same ballot Democrat Joe Biden won the district with 52.2%.

During the campaign, a research firm contracted by the Democratic Congressional Campaign Committee inappropriately obtained the military records of Don Bacon.

Republican primary

Candidates

Nominee 
 Don Bacon, incumbent U.S. representative

Eliminated in primary 
 Steve Kuehl

Withdrawn 
 Jim Schultze, IT professional

Endorsements

Results

Democratic primary

Candidates

Nominee 
 Tony Vargas, state senator

Eliminated in primary 
 Alisha Shelton, mental health counselor and candidate for U.S. Senate in 2020

Declined 
 Kara Eastman, nonprofit executive and nominee for this district in 2018 and 2020 (endorsed Shelton)
 John Ewing, Douglas County treasurer and nominee for this district in  2012
 Megan Hunt, state senator (running for re-election)
 Precious McKesson, political activist and Nebraska director for the Joe Biden 2020 presidential campaign
 Crystal Rhoades, member of the Nebraska Public Service Commission
 Sage Rosenfels, former professional football player

Endorsements

Results

General election

Debates and forums

Predictions

Polling
Aggregate polls

Graphical summary

Generic Republican vs. generic Democrat

Results

By county

District 3 

The 3rd district covers most of the rural central and western part of the state, and includes Grand Island, Kearney, Hastings, North Platte, Alliance, and Scottsbluff. The incumbent is Republican Adrian Smith, who was re-elected with 78.5% of the vote in 2020.

Republican primary

Candidates

Nominee 
Adrian Smith, incumbent U.S. Representative

Eliminated in primary 
Mike Calhoun

Endorsements

Results

Democratic Primary

Candidates

Nominee 
 David Else

Eliminated in primary 
 Daniel Wik, doctor

Results

Legal Marijuana Now primary

Candidates

Nominee
Mark Elworth Jr., chair of the Nebraska Legal Marijuana NOW Party, nominee for Vice President of the United States in 2016, and Democratic nominee for this district in 2020

Results

General election

Predictions

Results

Notes 

Partisan clients

References

External links 
 
 
  (State affiliate of the U.S. League of Women Voters)
 

Official campaign websites for 1st district candidates
 Patty Pansing Brooks (D) for Congress
 Mike Flood (R) for Congress

Official campaign websites for 2nd district candidates
 Don Bacon (R) for Congress
 Tony Vargas (D) for Congress

Official campaign websites for 3rd district candidates
 David Else (D) for Congress
 Adrian Smith (R) for Congress

Nebraska
2022
United States House of Representatives